Nowell may refer to:

Nowell (given name)
Nowell (surname)
Nowell, Wisconsin, a U.S. ghost town

See also

"The First Nowell" or "The First Noel", a traditional English carol
 Novell